Frederick John Robinson, 1st Earl of Ripon,  (1 November 1782 – 28 January 1859), styled The Honourable F. J. Robinson until 1827 and known between 1827 and 1833 as The Viscount Goderich (pronounced  ), the name by which he is best known to history, was a British politician who served as Prime Minister of the United Kingdom from 1827 to 1828.

A member of the rural landowning aristocracy, Robinson entered politics through family connections. In the House of Commons, he rose through junior ministerial ranks, achieving cabinet office in 1818 as President of the Board of Trade. In 1823, he was appointed Chancellor of the Exchequer, a post he held for four years. In 1827, he was raised to the peerage, and in the House of Lords was Leader of the House and Secretary of State for War and the Colonies.

In 1827, Prime Minister George Canning died after only 119 days in office, and Goderich succeeded him. But he was unable to hold together Canning's fragile coalition of moderate Tories and Whigs, and he himself resigned after only 144 days. Canning and Goderich were the two shortest-ruling Prime Ministers in British history, until Liz Truss in 2022.

After leaving the premiership Goderich served in the cabinets of two of his successors, the Earl Grey and Sir Robert Peel.

Life and career

Early years
Robinson was born at Newby Hall, Yorkshire, the second son of Thomas Robinson, 2nd Baron Grantham, by his wife Lady Mary Yorke, a daughter of Philip Yorke, 2nd Earl of Hardwicke. He was educated at a preparatory school at Sunbury-on-Thames, then attended Harrow School from 1796 to 1799, followed by St John's College, Cambridge, from 1799 to 1802. William Pitt the Younger was Member of Parliament for Cambridge University, to which, as The Times said, "accordingly most of the budding Tory statesmen of the day resorted". Robinson was an accomplished classicist, winning Sir William Browne's Medal for the best Latin ode in 1801. After graduating in 1802 he was admitted to Lincoln's Inn. He remained a member there until 1809, but did not pursue a legal career and was not called to the bar.

Against the background of the Napoleonic Wars Robinson did part-time military service at home as captain (1803), ultimately major (1814–1817) in the Northern Regiment of West Riding Yeomanry.

First political appointments
Robinson entered politics through a family connection. His mother's cousin, the third Earl of Hardwicke, Lord Lieutenant of Ireland, appointed him as his private secretary in 1804. Two years later Hardwicke secured for him the parliamentary seat of Carlow, a pocket borough near Dublin. In 1807 Robinson gave up the seat and was elected as MP for Ripon, close to his family home in Yorkshire.

In his first years in Parliament Robinson declined offers of junior ministerial posts, out of deference to his patron Hardwicke, who was an opponent of the Prime Minister, the Duke of Portland. However, the Foreign Secretary, George Canning, chose him as the secretary of Lord Pembroke's mission to Vienna, aimed at securing a new treaty of alliance between Britain and Austria. The mission was unsuccessful, but Robinson's reputation was not damaged, and, as his biographer E Royston Pike puts it, "as a good Tory [he was] given several small appointments in successive ministries." His political thinking was greatly influenced by Canning, but he became the protégé of Canning's rival Lord Castlereagh, who appointed him his under-secretary at the War Office in May 1809. When Castlereagh resigned from the government in October, unwilling to serve under the new Prime Minister, Spencer Perceval, Robinson resigned with him. In June 1810 he accepted office as a member of the Admiralty board. At the time of Perceval's assassination early in 1812, he was absent from parliament ostensibly on militia duties in Yorkshire.

He was made a Privy Counsellor in August 1812,

In 1814 Robinson married Lady Sarah Albinia Louisa Hobart (1793–1867), daughter of the 4th Earl of Buckinghamshire, and first cousin to Castlereagh's wife. There were three children of the marriage, only one of whom survived to adulthood:
 Hobart Frederick Robinson (September 1816)
 Eleanor Henrietta Robinson (31 October 1826)
 George Frederick Samuel Robinson, 1st Marquess of Ripon (24 October 1827 – 9 July 1909)

Robinson served under Lord Liverpool as Vice-President of the Board of Trade between 1812 and 1818, and as joint-Paymaster of the Forces between 1813 and 1817, from which position he sponsored the Corn Laws of 1815. Robinson's Corn Importation Bill, successfully presented to Parliament in February 1815, was a protectionist measure, imposing minimum prices for imported wheat and other grains. The historian Gregor Dallas writes:

The Corn Laws made the price of wheat artificially high, to the benefit of the landed classes and the detriment of the working classes. While the Bill was going through Parliament Robinson's London house in Old Burlington Street was frequently attacked by angry citizens; in one such attack the railings outside the house were ripped out, the front door smashed open, paintings ripped, and furniture thrown out of the window. In another attack two people were shot, one of them fatally. Describing the incident to the House of Commons Robinson was moved to tears, showing, as the biographer P J Jupp put it, "a propensity under stress which was to earn him the first of several nicknames, in this case the Blubberer".

Cabinet minister

In 1818 Robinson entered the cabinet as President of the Board of Trade and Treasurer of the Navy, under the premiership of Lord Liverpool. In 1823 he succeeded Nicholas Vansittart as Chancellor of the Exchequer. The historian Richard Helmstadter writes:

Robinson served as Chancellor for four years, and was regarded as a success in the post. The public finances were in good order, with a revenue surplus for the first three years of his chancellorship. He cut taxes and made grants to house the Royal Library in the British Museum and to buy the Angerstein Collection for the National Gallery. Jupp writes, "These achievements, together with his support for Catholic relief and the abolition of slavery, led to his being regarded as one of the most liberal members of the government and to two more nicknames – 'Prosperity Robinson' and 'Goody'." Robinson's last year at the Treasury was overshadowed by a run on the banks, caused by the collapse of the City of London bankers Pole Thornton and Co. Robinson was not blamed for the collapse, but his measures to mitigate the crisis were widely seen as half-hearted.

Under strain from the financial crisis, Robinson asked Liverpool for a change of post. In January 1827 he was given a peerage as Viscount Goderich, but Liverpool had no time to reshuffle his cabinet, being taken ill in February 1827 and resigning the premiership. He was succeeded by Canning, whose appointment caused a major realignment in the political factions of the day. The Tories split into four groups, distinguished by their view of Catholic Emancipation. Canning and his followers were liberal on the matter; Robinson belonged to a moderate group that was willing to support Canning; the faction led by the Duke of Wellington and Robert Peel opposed emancipation; and an ultra-Tory group resisted any kind of liberalising measure. To the anger of the King, George IV, who regarded it as a betrayal, Wellington and Peel refused to serve under Canning. With half the Tories ranged against him, Canning was obliged to seek support from the Whigs. Goderich, appointed by Canning as Leader of the House of Lords as well as Secretary of State for War and the Colonies, found the upper house no less stressful than the Commons. He was the target for the anger of the anti-Canning Tories in the Lords, suffering many personal verbal assaults; when he attempted to get a new Corn Law enacted it was defeated by an alliance of peers led by Wellington.

Prime Minister

Canning's health had been declining since the beginning of 1827, and on 8 August he died. A prominent Whig commented, "God has declared against us. He is manifestly for the tories, and I fear the king also, which is much worse." The King, however, though he had long inclined to favour Tories over Whigs, was still angry at the refusal of Wellington and Peel to serve in Canning's cabinet. A widespread expectation (possibly shared by Wellington himself) that the King would send for Wellington was confounded. On the day of Canning's death Goderich and the Home Secretary, William Sturges Bourne, were summoned to Windsor Castle, where the King announced his intention of appointing Goderich to the premiership.

Goderich immediately encountered difficulty in balancing the conflicting demands of the King and the Whigs about the composition of his cabinet. George considered that the three ministerial posts held by Whigs were quite enough; the Whigs pressed hard for the inclusion of a fourth, Lord Holland, as Foreign Secretary. Goderich satisfied nobody with his inability to resolve matters. A leading Whig, George Tierney, spoke of his party's dissatisfaction with Goderich: "[T]hey think Goderich has behaved so ill in this affair that they can have no confidence in him. They believe so much in the integrity of his character that they do not suspect him of any duplicity in what has passed, but his conduct has been marked by such deplorable weakness as shows how unfit he is for the situation he occupies." There was further discontent in the coalition cabinet at Goderich's vacillation over the appointment of a Chancellor of the Exchequer, once again caught between the demands of the King and those of his Whig allies. Within a month, William Huskisson, a Tory colleague, was writing of Goderich: "The king has taken the exact measure of him, and openly says he must do all the duties of a premier himself, because Goderich has no nerves! I am using nearly his own words; and he has been acting, and still talks of acting up to this declaration." George's contempt for his Prime Minister was confirmed in his description of Goderich as "a damned, snivelling, blubbering blockhead."

In addition to the conflicting pressures from the King and the Whigs, Goderich had to cope with the mental problems from which his wife was suffering. In December Huskisson wrote:

Wellington was by now distancing himself from the Extreme-Tory wing of his party, and by January 1828 the King had concluded that the coalition could not continue and that a Tory ministry under Wellington would be preferable. Goderich had already written a letter of resignation to the King, but had not yet sent it, when he was summoned to Windsor. He described the disintegrating state of his administration; the King asked him to send for the Lord Chancellor, who was in turn bidden to summon Wellington to receive the King's commission to form a government. According to one account, Goderich was in tears during his interview with the King, who passed him a handkerchief, but within days Goderich was rejoicing in his release from office: "quite another man [who] sleeps at nights now, and laughs and talks as usual." His premiership had lasted 144 days, which remains one of the shortest in British history, twenty-five days longer than that of his immediate predecessor, Canning.

Goderich is 'the man with the hat' in the painting "The Staircase of the London Residence of the Painter" by the Dutch painter Pieter Christoffel Wonder. In 2014 a Dutch art student did research on the painting and discovered that it depicts the resignation of Prime Minister Frederick John Robinson in January 1828.

Later cabinet posts

In 1830 Goderich moved over to the Whigs and joined Lord Grey's cabinet, as Colonial Secretary. Both on moral and on economic grounds he was strongly opposed to slavery throughout his career, and he worked hard in the 1830s for the emancipation of slaves throughout the British Empire. His work was continued by his successor as Colonial Secretary, Lord Stanley, whose abolitionist legislation Goderich piloted through the House of Lords.

In 1833 Goderich was created Earl of Ripon. He had not sought the advancement in the peerage, but wished to accept the King's offer of the Garter, for which, at that time, a viscountcy was considered an insufficient rank. He left the Colonial Office in the same year, and did not wish to hold any further office, but Grey insisted on his taking the senior non-departmental post of Lord Privy Seal. However, the next year Goderich and Stanley broke with the Whigs over what they saw as a threat to the established status of the Church of Ireland.

From 1841 to 1843 Ripon served in Peel's second administration as President of the Board of Trade, with the young W. E. Gladstone as his deputy. His final ministerial post was President of the Board of Control from 1843 to 1846. During his career, as Helmstadter observes, he had been, in succession, "a Pittite, a Tory, a Canningite, a Whig, a Stanleyite, a Conservative, and a Peelite. Between 1818 and 1846 he was a member of every government except Wellington's and Melbourne's."

Apart from his political career Goderich served as president of the Royal Geographical Society from 1830 to 1833, and of the Royal Society of Literature from 1834 to 1845. He died in January 1859, aged 76. He outlived five of his successors in the prime ministry.

Ripon died at Putney Heath, London, in January 1859, aged 76. He was succeeded by his only son, George who became a noted Liberal statesman and cabinet minister and was created Marquess of Ripon. The son was unique in being conceived at No. 11 Downing Street, while Robinson was Chancellor of the Exchequer, and being born at No. 10, when his father, now Goderich, was Prime Minister.

Goderich's government, September 1827 – January 1828

 Lord Goderich – First Lord of the Treasury and Leader of the House of Lords
 Lord Lyndhurst – Lord Chancellor
 The Duke of Portland – Lord President of the Council
 The Earl of Carlisle – Lord Privy Seal
 The Marquess of Lansdowne – Secretary of State for the Home Department
 The Earl of Dudley – Secretary of State for Foreign Affairs
 William Huskisson – Secretary of State for War and the Colonies and Leader of the House of Commons
 J. C. Herries – Chancellor of the Exchequer
 The Marquess of Anglesey – Master-General of the Ordnance
 Charles Grant – President of the Board of Trade and Treasurer of the Navy
 Charles Williams-Wynn – President of the Board of Control
 William Sturges Bourne – First Commissioner of Woods and Forests
 Lord Bexley – Chancellor of the Duchy of Lancaster
 Viscount Palmerston – Secretary at War

Notes and references
Notes

References

Sources

External links 
 
 More about Frederick Robinson, Viscount Goderich on the 10 Downing Street website.
 
 
 Paper by M. Oderwald: "The stairecase of the Londen residence of the painter".

|-

1782 births
1859 deaths
19th-century prime ministers of the United Kingdom
Prime Ministers of the United Kingdom
British Secretaries of State
Robinson, Frederick John
Ripon, Frederick John Robinson, 1st Earl of
Robinson, Frederick John
Paymasters of the Forces
Tory MPs (pre-1834)
Robinson, Frederick
Robinson, Frederick
Goderich, Federick
People from Ripon
Members of the Privy Council of the United Kingdom
Alumni of St John's College, Cambridge
Earls of Ripon
Peers of the United Kingdom created by George IV
Peers of the United Kingdom created by William IV
Younger sons of barons
Fellows of the Royal Society
Robinson, Frederick
Robinson, Frederick
Robinson, Frederick
Robinson, Frederick
Robinson, Frederick
Robinson, Frederick
UK MPs who were granted peerages
19th-century heads of government
Frederick John
Tory prime ministers of the United Kingdom
Presidents of the Board of Trade
Presidents of the Royal Society of Literature
Leaders of the House of Lords
Presidents of the Board of Control